�

Belmont is an independent co-educational  school in Surrey which takes pupils from the ages of 3 to 16. 
The school is a charitable trust, administered by an independent Board of Governors.

Location
Belmont is located in 65 acres of woodland on a hill to the east of Holmbury St Mary. The school is a mile north-west of Leith Hill in the Surrey Hills AONB.

History
Belmont School was founded in 1880 as a day school in London. The school subsequently moved to the village of Westcott, Surrey, before moving to its current location in 1955.

Architecture
Belmont is centred on the Grade II-listed Victorian mansion, Feldemore, an arts and crafts house, which includes work by William Morris and William de Morgan. The house was built for Edwin Waterhouse, co-founder of the accountancy practice of Price Waterhouse. 
The main house was destroyed by a fire in 1991, but has since been rebuilt and restored.

Notable alumni
Alice Capsey (born 2004), English cricketer

Footnotes

External links
 Belmont School website
 2011 Independent Schools Inspectorate Report 

Private schools in Surrey
Boys' schools in Surrey
Girls' schools in Surrey
Mole Valley
Grade II listed buildings in Surrey